The governor of Oriental Mindoro is the local chief executive and head of the Provincial Government of Oriental Mindoro in the Philippines. Along with the governors of Marinduque, Occidental Mindoro, Palawan, and Romblon, the province's chief executive is a member of the Regional Development Council of the Mimaropa Region.

History
On November 15, 1950, through Republic Act No. 505 signed by President Elpidio Quirino and as stated on his Proclamation No. 186, s. 1950, Mindoro was divided into two separate provinces of Occidental Mindoro and Oriental Mindoro. Subsequently, the first provincial election was held on November 13, 1951.

List of governors of Oriental Mindoro

References

Governors of provinces of the Philippines